The mayor of Miami Beach is the nonpartisan chief executive of the municipal government of Miami Beach, Florida, and the presiding member of its seven-member City Commission.  Modern-day mayors are elected to two-year terms and are term-limited to no more than 3 terms, which can be consecutive or non-consecutive.  The mayor and other members of the City Commission appoint a city manager to administer the day-to-day affairs and operations of City Hall and its various departments.  City Hall is located at 1700 Convention Center Drive; the mayor's office is located on the fourth floor.

The current mayor is Dan Gelber, who was elected on November 7, 2017, and assumed office on November 13, 2017.  He was reelected on September 6, 2019, and, on November 2, 2021, to his third and final term.  He is the son of the 33rd mayor, Seymour Gelber.  The younger Gelber is the third son to follow in his father's footsteps and hold the office.  Other father-son combinations who served as mayors include the John Lummuses (Jr. and Sr.) and the Dermers (Jay and David).

Mayors (1915–present)

See also
 Miami Beach
 Miami Dade County

References

External links
 City of Miami Beach
 Political Graveyard:  Mayors of Miami Beach, Florida

Miami Beach
 
Miami Beach, Florida